Dainis Zīlītis (born 14 September 1969) is a Latvian weightlifter. He competed in the men's light heavyweight event at the 1996 Summer Olympics.

References

1969 births
Living people
Latvian male weightlifters
Olympic weightlifters of Latvia
Weightlifters at the 1996 Summer Olympics
People from Saldus
20th-century Latvian people